Beyond the Crossroads is a 1922 American silent melodrama film starring Ora Carew and Lawson Butt. It was directed by Lloyd Carleton.

This film survives in the Library of Congress collection.

Cast
Ora Carew as Leila Wilkes
Lawson Butt as John Pierce / James Fordham
Melbourne MacDowell as David Walton / Truman Breese
Stuart Morris as Charles Wilked
Joseph Johnson as Mean Man

References

External links

1922 films
American silent feature films
1922 drama films
Silent American drama films
American black-and-white films
Melodrama films
1920s American films